The reverend Samuel Kilderbee (1725–1813) was a churchman, lawyer, and town clerk of Ipswich. He was also known for his close friendship with the painter Thomas Gainsborough.

See also
Philip Thicknesse
Spencer Horsey de Horsey

References

External links 
https://kirbyandhisworld.wordpress.com/2012/12/09/samuel-kilderbee-1725-1813/
http://www.artfund.org/supporting-museums/art-weve-helped-buy/artwork/1014/portrait-of-the-rev-samuel-kilderbee-thomas-gainsborough

1725 births
1813 deaths
Clergy from Ipswich
18th-century English lawyers
18th-century English Anglican priests
19th-century English lawyers
19th-century English Anglican priests